The Canon EOS 70D is a digital single-lens reflex camera by Canon publicly announced on July 2, 2013 with a suggested retail price of $1,199. As a part of the Canon EOS two-digit line, it is the successor to the EOS 60D and is the predecessor of the EOS 80D.

The EOS 70D is the launch platform for Canon's Dual Pixel CMOS Autofocus, which provides great improvement in focusing speed while in Live View, both for stills and video.  At large apertures such as f/1.8, the 70D's Dual Pixel CMOS Autofocus provides a significant improvement in focus accuracy and consistency over conventional autofocus.

The 70D can be purchased as a body alone, or in a package with an EF-S 18–55mm f/3.5–5.6 IS STM lens, EF-S 18–135mm f/3.5-5.6 IS STM lens, and/or EF-S 18–200mm f/3.5-5.6 IS lens.

The most recent available firmware is version 1.1.3.

Features
Compared to the EOS 60D, the following changes have been made, including:
 Resolution increased to 20.2 MP CMOS Sensor (60D has 18.1 MP)
 DIGIC 5+ image processor (DIGIC 4 on 60D)
19-point AF System, all cross-type at f/5.6. Center point is high precision, double cross-type at f/2.8 or faster. (9 points, all cross-type on 60D)
 98% viewfinder coverage, 0.95× magnification (96% coverage with same magnification for 60D)
 Faster continuous shooting at 7.0 fps (5.3 fps on the 60D)
 Built-in Wi-Fi (not on the 60D)
 3.0″ vari-angle Clear View II LCD touchscreen (no touchscreen on the 60D)
 Maximum sensor sensitivity increased to ISO 12800 maximum (H: 25600 expanded) – compare to 6400 (H: 12800 expanded) on the 60D
 New Dual Pixel CMOS AF (only standard contrast-detection in live view on 60D)
 Allows the use of high precision phase-detection autofocus in live view, functional across 80% of the frame down to 0EV and 
Full HD EOS Movies
Digital Zoom in movie mode—offers a full HD crop from the center of the sensor for an approximate 3x zoom with no loss of image quality, plus a digitally interpolated 10x zoom (only previously available on 600D/Rebel T3i)
 AF microadjustment (was introduced on the 50D, but not present on the 60D)
 The 70D allows microadjustment at both focal length extremes of the same zoom lens.
 HDR (not available in-camera on the 60D)
 Multi exposure Mode (not available on the 60D)
 Exposure bracketing of up to 7 frames (3 frames for the 60D)
 One SD/SDHC/SDXC card slot, supports the UHS-I bus (UHS-I support is an upgrade compared to the 60D)
 External 3.5mm stereo microphone jack
 Viewfinder level indicator.  The indicator remains active in autofocus mode until the shutter is released. (In earlier Canon bodies with this feature, the indicator remains fully active only in manual focus mode; if in autofocus mode, the indicator disappears from view once the shutter button is half-pressed for autofocus.)

Phenomenon
The Canon EOS 70D with certain serial numbers (within the range "00" to "22") produce the error code 70 and 80 for an unknown reason. Canon has recalled the product. Customers who experience this phenomenon can contact Canon by registering their serial number and requesting free service/replacement.

References

External links

Product page

70D
Live-preview digital cameras
Cameras introduced in 2013

The CANON EOS 70D turns black when the screen is finished for general use.